Stilbosis cyclocosma is a moth in the family Cosmopterigidae. It was described by Edward Meyrick in 1921. It is found in Mozambique.

This species has a wingspan of 15–17 mm.  Its forewings are dark-purplish fuscous with a circular whitish subbasal area containing a large grey raised costal spot.

See also
List of moths of Mozambique

References

Natural History Museum Lepidoptera generic names catalog

Endemic fauna of Mozambique
Moths described in 1921
Chrysopeleiinae
Moths of Sub-Saharan Africa
Lepidoptera of Mozambique